The 2020  Men's PSA World Series Finals was the men's edition of the PSA World Tour Finals (Prize money : $185,000). The top 8 players in the 2019–20 PSA World Tour are qualified for the event. The event took place at Mall of Arabia, Cairo in Egypt from 28 September–3 October 2020.

It's the second edition under the PSA World Tour Finals label after the PSA renamed PSA World Series to current PSA World Tour Finals. CIB remains as the title sponsor.

Karim Abdel Gawad was the defending champion but was beaten in the Final to Marwan El Shorbagy. Marwan won the Final 3–0 (11–6, 11–5, 11–3) (47min) in his only second World Tour Finals appearance.

PSA World Ranking Points
PSA also awards points towards World Ranking. Points are awarded as follows:

Match points distribution
Points towards the standings are awarded when the following scores:

Qualification & Seeds

Qualification
Top eight players at 2019–20 PSA World Tour standings qualifies to Finals.

Seeds

Group stage results
Times are Eastern European Time (UTC+02:00). To the best of three games.

Group A

Standings

Group B

Standings

Knockout stage

Semifinal
To the best of three games.

Final
To the best of five games.

See also
2020 Women's PSA World Tour Finals
2019–20 PSA World Tour
2020–21 PSA World Tour
2019–20 PSA World Tour Finals
PSA World Tour Finals

References

External links
PSA World Tour Finals at PSA website
PSA World Tour Finals official website

PSA World Tour
M
PSA World Tour Finals
PSA World Tour Finals
PSA World Tour Finals